Jasminum subtriplinerve is a species of jasmine, in the family Oleaceae. Its leaves are used as a drink in Vietnam.

References

External links

subtriplinerve
Flora of Vietnam
Plants described in 1851